Hatley Park National Historic Site is located in Colwood, British Columbia, in Greater Victoria. It is the site of Hatley Castle, a Classified Federal Heritage Building. Since 1995, the mansion and estate have been used for the public Royal Roads University. From the 1940s to 1995, it was used for the Royal Roads Military College, a naval training facility.

The extensive grounds of the historic site have formal gardens, former farmland, and trails through mature stands of first and second-growth forest, including large Douglas fir and western red cedar.

History

Hatley Castle and Gardens 

In 1906, B.C.'s Lieutenant Governor, James Dunsmuir, who was of Scottish descent, purchased the property.  He and his wife Laura commissioned the renowned Canadian architect Samuel Maclure to build a 40-room mansion in the Scottish baronial style; the Tudor revival style was popular in the Edwardian period. The Dunsmuirs created many beautiful formal gardens using the services of renowned American garden designers Franklin Brett and George D. Hall of Boston, Massachusetts. The Dunsmuirs named their estate "Hatley Park", in the tradition of British and European private estates. The castle became a landmark and was occupied by descendants of the Dunsmuir family until after the Great Depression, in 1937.

Following the death of Laura Dunsmuir in 1937 the estate was sold to the Government of Canada in 1939. The government sold off some of the land and during five days in June 1939, "Maynard & Sons" conducted a public auction of the mansion's contents totaling 927 lots.

A Historic Sites and Monuments Board of Canada plaque reads:

Hatley Park. This superb example of an Edwardian park was laid out for James and Laura Dunsmuir in the early 20th century. At its centre stands a Tudor Revival mansion, whose picturesque design is enhanced by a rich array of decoration and fine craftmanship. The grounds, featuring a variety of native and exotic vegetation, unfold from formal gardens to recreational spaces, farmlands and forests. Acquired by the Canadian armed forces in 1940, Hatley Park evolved to meet the needs of Royal Roads Military College in a manner that has preserved its essential Edwardian character.

The Royal Roads Military College band consisting of 15 pipers and drummers and 30 brass-and-reed musician recorded an LP in 1983–1984. Petty Officer First Class Gabby R. Bruner, RRMC bandmaster from 1979 to 1985, composed "Hatley Park" as the official quick march for the RRMC and "Dunsmuir Castle" for the Visit of Queen Elizabeth to RRMC in 1983.

In 2008, the 100th anniversary of Hatley Castle was celebrated.

Planned royal residence
At the outbreak of World War II, contingency plans were made for King George VI, his wife Queen Elizabeth, and their two daughters, princesses Elizabeth and Margaret, to reside in Canada in the event of an invasion of Britain. The family's primary options were stately homes in England, but Victoria, BC was the backup site in case German troops reached the Midlands. (See Coats Mission.)

The federal Crown-in-Council purchased Hatley Castle in 1940 for use as the King's royal residence. The Royal Family and government decided against their leaving the UK during the war, and the family stayed in London.

Royal Roads Military College
The Canadian government adapted the mansion as a naval training facility.  From 1948 it was known as the Royal Roads Military College.  It is named for the Royal Roads body of water, which forms the entrance into Esquimalt Harbour from the Strait of Juan de Fuca, lying to the east of the facility. The military college was closed in 1995 and the estate leased to the Province of British Columbia.  That same year, the castle and grounds were designated a National Historic Site of Canada.

In September 1995, Royal Roads University was opened as a public, degree-granting university.  It leases the campus from the Department of National Defence for $1 per year. The university manages all stewardship responsibilities related to the site, including site management, operations, heritage preservation and restoration, and educating the public about the site's history and natural resources.

Hatley Gardens 

In 1912, the Dunsmuirs engaged the American landscape architects Franklin Brett and George D. Hall of Boston, students of Frederick Law Olmsted, to develop a landscape for the entire site. They prepared a classic design for an Edwardian park that included the overall layout for the entire property. The plan organized the estate into four distinct landscape zones, progressing from a series of nine formal 'garden rooms' near Hatley Castle, to recreational spaces, then to agricultural lands, and finally to the forest surrounding the estate. During the Dunsmuir era, approximately 100 gardeners and groundskeepers tended the estate. During the years when the cadets attended Royal Roads Military College, the Department of National Defence employed approximately 50 gardeners and groundskeepers to maintain the property; a testimony to their commitment to retain the integrity of the estate.

The Edwardian estate is located on southern Vancouver Island and has views of the Olympic mountains in USA. The gardens are an  estate, including the house's park, and are also a popular wedding location. Today, Royal Roads University employs five full-time gardeners, one arborist, a garden curator, seven seasonal gardeners and groundskeepers, and one manager. As the university does not receive any federal, provincial or municipal funding to maintain the site, the gardeners must make choices about the areas that can be best presented. They have made the Japanese, Rose and Italian gardens the showcase areas of the property.

Admission fees era 
In June 2006, citing the unfunded costs of heritage preservation, the university started charging admission fees to its main heritage gardens, an area that makes up less than five per cent of the  campus. This prompted some public controversy for the $12 for adults in the summer and $6 during the winter fees, which helped subsidise $550,000 yearly maintenance costs (a fee which since risen), but the garden fee only brought $40,000 a year. It also introduced a $15 four-month summer garden pass for residents of Greater Victoria, in addition to the free pass offered to residents of Colwood. As of 2019 the fee was cancelled and the gardens are free to visit.

Use in TV and film
Hatley parks and castle has been the venue for dozens of films and T.V. shows for over 80 years.

 Hatley Castle is shown in the Smallville television series as Luthor Mansion, the estate belonging to Lex Luthor.
 The castle has been featured in two series of X-Men related media as Xavier's School for Gifted Youngsters.
 The 1996 television film Generation X
 The X-Men film series, starting from 2003's X2: X-Men United and including X-Men: The Last Stand, Deadpool, and Deadpool 2. Elements of Hatley Castle's exterior influenced the new versions of Xavier's school in X-Men: Days of Future Past, X-Men: Apocalypse, and Dark Phoenix. 
 The castle is the house of Hubert, dog protagonist of The Duke.
 It was used in the 1997 film, Masterminds as Shady Glen School, supposedly a private elementary school in California.
 The castle was used in MacGyver TV series. In the second episode of season 5, "The Legend of the Holy Rose, part 2", as a hideout for the episode's villain.
 In the TV series Seven Days, episode 9 of season 2, "Love and Other Disasters", the castle is used as a home for a royal family and a place for a royal wedding.
 In the series Poltergeist: The Legacy, Hatley Castle was the headquarters of the San Francisco legacy.
 Many scenes of Fierce People (2004) were filmed in the interior and exterior of Hatley Castle. It was used as the stately home of the rich family clan of Ogden C. Osborne.
 The ending scenes of The Changeling (1979) were filmed inside Hatley Castle.
 Big Time Movie, based on the TV series Big Time Rush, was filmed on some parts of the property for its 2011 release.
 Shown in the Arrow television series as Queen Mansion, home of Oliver Queen and his family.
 Shown in the Witches of East End television series as Home of Gardiner family.
 Shown in The Killing television series as St. George's military academy.
 Shown in the Disney movie Descendants (2015), Descendants 2 (2017), and Descendants 3 (2019) as Auradon Prep, the school for the children of Disney fairy tale characters.
 Shown in the TV series The Dead Zone.
 Shown in the Fox TV series Bones in the season 11 episode "The Promise in the Palace" as the Magic Palace.
 Featured in the 2018 film The Professor.
 Hosted the Starting Line of The Amazing Race Canada 6.
 The staircase is shown in the CW TV series Supernatural at the abandoned asylum in Advanced Thanatology, the fifth episode of season 13.
 The exterior was portrayed as a luxury hotel in the 1992 film Knight Moves.

Buildings
The Register of the Government of Canada Heritage Buildings lists nine recognized buildings and one classified building on the grounds of the Hatley Park National Historic Site.

See also 
 Hatley Park, Greater Victoria

References

Note

External links 

 Hatley Park Website
 Royal Roads University

Castles in Canada
Estate gardens in Canada
Heritage sites in British Columbia
Historic house museums in British Columbia
History of British Columbia
Japanese gardens in Canada
Museums in British Columbia
National Historic Sites in British Columbia
Scottish baronial architecture in Canada
Southern Vancouver Island
Classified Federal Heritage Building